"Saints & Angels" is a song written by Victoria Banks and recorded by American country music artist Sara Evans. It was released in September 2001 as the third single from her 2000 album Born to Fly. The song peaked at number 16 on the US Billboard Hot Country Songs chart. Evans has stated that this was her favorite song from her Born to Fly album.

Content 
"Saints & Angels" is a mid-tempo piano ballad that describes a couple who is troubled by their love and pressured by their imperfections. However, in the end, they overcome their differences and essentially become "saints & angels."

Music video 
The accompanying music video for the song features Evans on a sidewalk with many people passing in front of her. These scenes are intercut with scenes of couples fighting and making up. Evans is also shown wearing a green T-shirt with a cross and in a blue sweater.

Chart performance 
"Saints & Angels" debuted at number 48 on the U.S. Billboard Hot Country Singles & Tracks for the week of September 15, 2001

References 

2001 singles
2000 songs
Sara Evans songs
Country ballads
Music videos directed by Peter Zavadil
Songs written by Victoria Banks
Song recordings produced by Paul Worley
RCA Records singles